Baron Jones or Lord Jones could refer to one of the following (Baroness Jones for a peeress)
Barry Jones, Baron Jones (born 1939), Labour Party politician in the United Kingdom
Baron Jones of Naven (a subsidiary title held by Viscount Ranelagh)
Michael Jones, Lord Jones (1948–2016), Senator of the College of Justice in Scotland
Nigel Jones, Baron Jones of Cheltenham (born 1948), Liberal Democrat politician in the United Kingdom
Digby Jones, Baron Jones of Birmingham (born 1955), British businessman and politician
Maggie Jones, Baroness Jones of Whitchurch (born 1955), British Labour Peer and former trade union official and Labour politician
Jenny Jones (Green politician), Baroness Jones of Moulsecoomb

The following either use a title which does not include Jones or have 
double-barreled names 
Leifchild Jones, 1st Baron Rhayader
Thomas Jones, Baron Maelor (1898–1984), British Labour politician
Alun Jones, Baron Chalfont
Elwyn Jones, Baron Elwyn-Jones (1909–1989), Welsh barrister and Labour politician
Timothy Clement-Jones, Baron Clement-Jones (born 1949), Liberal Democrat Peer and their spokesman for the Creative Industries in the House of Lords
William Wynne-Jones, Baron Wynne-Jones (1903–1982), British chemist
Tristan Garel-Jones, Baron Garel-Jones
Pauline Neville-Jones, Baroness Neville-Jones (born 1939), former BBC Governor and Chairman of the British Joint Intelligence Committee (JIC)
Antony Armstrong-Jones, 1st Earl of Snowdon (1930–2017), Baron Armstrong-Jones
Samuel Jones-Loyd, 1st Baron Overstone (1796–1883), British banker and politician

See also
Jones (disambiguation)
Jones (surname), a surname of English origins, meaning "John's son"

Noble titles created in 2001
Noble titles created for UK MPs